Tirani (Aymara tira cradle, -ni a suffix, "the one with a cradle", also spelled Tirane) is a  mountain in the Andes of Peru. It is situated in the Arequipa Region, Condesuyos Province, on the border of the districts of Cayarani and  Salamanca.

References 

Mountains of Peru
Mountains of Arequipa Region